Fot or FOT may refer to:

Arts and entertainment 
 The Fall of Troy (band), an American rock band
 Fallout Tactics: Brotherhood of Steel, a computer game
 False or True, a British television programme

Science and technology 
 Fast optical transient
 Flight operations team
 Frequency of optimum transmission
 The Fot1 family of Fusarium oxysporum transposable elements

Transport 
 Fo Tan station, in Hong Kong 
 Fort railway station, in Sri Lanka
 Rohnerville Airport, in California, United States
FOT, free on truck, an historic form of international commercial term or Incoterm
 Forster (Wallis Island) Airport, IATA airport code "FOT"

Other uses 
 Fot, 11th-century Swedish runemaster
 Fót, a town in Pest county, Hungary
 Feast of Tabernacles, part of the Jewish religious festival of Sukkot
 Festival of Trees
 Fotki, a photo sharing web-site
 Future-oriented therapy, a form of psychotherapy